Barnard's Loop (catalogue designation Sh 2-276) is an emission nebula in the constellation of Orion.  It is part of the Orion molecular cloud complex which also contains the dark Horsehead and bright Orion nebulae.  The loop takes the form of a large arc centered approximately on the Orion Nebula.  The stars within the Orion Nebula are believed to be responsible for ionizing the loop.

The loop extends over about 600 arcminutes as seen from Earth, covering much of Orion.  It is well seen in long-exposure photographs, although observers under very dark skies may be able to see it with the naked eye.

Recent estimates place it at a distance of either 159 pc (518 light years) or 440 pc (1434 ly) giving it dimensions of either about 100 or 300 ly across respectively. It is thought to have originated in a supernova explosion about 2 million years ago, which may have also created several known runaway stars, including AE Aurigae, Mu Columbae and 53 Arietis, which are believed to have been part of a multiple star system in which one component exploded as a supernova.

Although this faint nebula was certainly observed by earlier astronomers, it is named after the pioneering astrophotographer E. E. Barnard who photographed it and published a description in 1894.

References

External links

Photograph identifying several nebulae in Orion
Encyclopaedia of Astrobiology, Astronomy, and Spaceflight entry
The Scale of the Universe (Astronomy Picture of the Day 12 March 2012)

H II regions
Orion molecular cloud complex
Sharpless objects
Discoveries by Edward Emerson Barnard